Anuradha Acharya (born 1972) is an Indian entrepreneur. She is the founder and CEO of Ocimum Bio Solutions and Mapmygenome. She was awarded Young Global Leader by the World Economic Forum in 2011.

Early life 
Acharya was born in Bikaner but spent most of her life in Kharagpur. Acharya graduated from IIT Kharagpur in 1995. She then moved to Chicago in 1995 and acquired Master of Science in Physics and MIS (Management Information Systems) from the University of Illinois at Chicago.

Positions held 
Acharya is the founder and was the CEO of Ocimum Bio Solutions, a genomics outsourcing company for discovery, development and diagnostics, headquartered in Hyderabad, India from 2000 to 2013. She also serves as a member of the governing body of Council of Scientific & Industrial Research, on the board for the National Institute of Biomedical Genomics based in Kalyani, West Bengal, on the Global Agenda Council on Genetics 2011 in the capacity of Vice Chair.

Acharya is the founder and CEO of Mapmygenome- A molecular Diagnostic company that offer personal genomics and diagnostics products.

She is also a board member for the Association of Biotech Enterprises, is on the advisory board for the Action for India and on the board of mentors at IvyCap Ventures. The Maryland-based company Gene Logic's Genomics division was acquired by Ocimum in 2007 and in 2012 Ocimum sold a portion of the business (BioRepository), to Transgenomics and moved the rest of the business to India.

Prior to founding Ocimum, Acharya held positions in a consulting company called SEI Information and a telecommunications software company called Mantiss Information which has since been acquired by Dynegy Corporation.

Recognition 
Acharya was named by Red Herring Magazine to the list of 25 Tech Titans under 35 in 2006. Acharya has also received the Entrepreneur of the year award by Biospectrum magazine. and the Astia Life Science Innovators Award in 2008. Acharya has been honoured as a 2011 Young Global Leader by the World Economic Forum.
Acharya was awarded ET Women Ahead honor by the Economic Times in 2015. She was named in the 2018 W-power trailblazers by Forbes.

Acharya has a book on Poetry published called "Atomic Pohe- Random Rhymes at odd times- On Science, Non Science and Nonsense."
Acharya has written a chapter on Research as a Service (RaaS) in the book Pharmaceutical Outsourcing: Discovery and Preclinical Services (Pharmaceutical Outsourcing, Volume I). Acharya also published an article in Nature Biotechnology called "What mergers can do for you" and is an active contributor to various other magazines and newspapers like the Hindu Business Line.

Personal life 
Acharya was born to a professor and lived early years of her life in a campus town. Acharya is married to Subash Lingareddy, founder and CFO of Ocimum Bio Solutions. They have two daughters.

See also 
Genome Valley

References

External links

1972 births
Living people
IIT Kharagpur alumni
Businesspeople from Rajasthan
Indian women engineers
Biotechnologists
Indian biotechnologists
People from Bikaner
University of Illinois Chicago alumni
Businesswomen from Rajasthan
Women biotechnologists
Engineers from Rajasthan
Indian women biologists
21st-century Indian biologists
21st-century Indian engineers
Women scientists from Rajasthan
21st-century Indian businesswomen
21st-century Indian businesspeople
21st-century women engineers